The Anti World Tour (stylized as ANTI World Tour) was the seventh concert tour by Barbadian singer Rihanna, in support of her eighth studio album, Anti (2016). The tour was announced on November 15, 2015 and began on March 12, 2016, in Jacksonville and ended on November 27, 2016, in Abu Dhabi, United Arab Emirates.

It was the twenty-second-highest-grossing tour of 2016 in North America, according to Pollstars annual Year End Top 200 North American Tours chart, grossing $40.3 million. The tour in the US sold 454,955 tickets in 41 shows. The tour earned a total of $110 million worldwide.

Background 
After the release of her seventh studio album, Unapologetic, (2012) and her fifth concert tour, the Diamonds World Tour, Rihanna went on a hiatus. Between 2005 and 2012, Rihanna released or re-released at least one album a year. However, in 2013, Rihanna took a step back from music and did not release a new album that year or the following. Instead Rihanna opted to take part in other endeavors, starring in a 3D animated film entitled Home, alongside Jim Parsons, Steve Martin and Jennifer Lopez, as well as executively producing its accompanying soundtrack.

In November 2015, it was announced that Rihanna had signed a $25 million contract with Samsung to not only promote Samsung's Galaxy line of products, but to also sponsor the release of Anti and its supporting tour. On November 23, 2015, Rihanna announced she would be embarking on "The Anti World Tour". The Samsung-sponsored tour began in March 2016, with Travis Scott supporting in North America, and Big Sean and DJ Mustard supporting at selected European dates.

Critical reception

North America
In a review for The New York Times, Jon Caramanica stated that Rihanna was at her "most confident" and "the most present she's ever been onstage", calling her dancing "casual" and that she "appeared to be finding joy in singing — when she was doing it." Reviewing the Los Angeles concert, Latifah Muhammad from VIBE described the tour as a "randomly epic road trip."

Europe
Ed Power from The Telegraph gave Dublin concert four stars, writing that the tour "didn't waste time on embellishments and instead delivered full-strength shots of sass and escapism." The London concert also received four stars from The Guardian, where Michael Cragg praised the singer's "unshakeable Rihanna-ness; that perfect pop voice, the undeniable presence, that couldn't-give-a-shit attitude."

Set list  
This set list is representative of the show in Jacksonville on March 12, 2016. It is not representative of all concerts for the duration of the tour.

"Stay"
"Love the Way You Lie (Part II)" 
"Woo"
"Sex with Me"
"Birthday Cake" / "Pour It Up" / "Numb" 
"Bitch Better Have My Money"
"Pose"
"Goodnight Gotham" 
"Consideration"
"Live Your Life" / "Run This Town" / "All of the Lights"
"Umbrella" 
"Desperado"
"Man Down" 
"Rude Boy" 
"Work" 
"Take Care" / "We Found Love" / "How Deep is Your Love"
"Where Have You Been"
"Needed Me"
"Same Ol' Mistakes"
"Diamonds"
"FourFiveSeconds" 
Encore
"Love on the Brain"
"Kiss It Better"

Notes
 During the shows in Miami and Manchester, and the second shows in Toronto and Inglewood, Drake joined Rihanna on stage during "Work".
 During the show in Milan, Rihanna did not perform "FourFiveSeconds" and "Kiss It Better", due to a summer storm which caused a late start of the concert.

Tour dates

Cancelled shows

References

Notes

Citations

External links
 Anti World Tour: Live Nation concerts

2016 concert tours
Rihanna concert tours